Fall Mountain Regional High School is a small high school located in Langdon, New Hampshire, in the United States. The school, part of School Administrative Unit 60 in New Hampshire, serves the towns of Langdon, Acworth, Alstead, Charlestown, and Walpole.

Formation and opening

The Fall Mountain Regional School Board was created in 1964 with the goal of opening a cooperative high school from the local towns. In September 1964, the Board engaged the architectural firm of Haines, Leineck & Smith from Lowell, Massachusetts to design preliminary plans for the new high school. An award to R.E. Bean Company of Keene, New Hampshire to build the new school for $1,075,887 was announced in August 1965.

The school opened in September 1966.Milliken, Joe (20 April 2022). Fall Mountain Regional High School launches official Alumni Association, Vermont Journal The student body was created by combining the students of Walpole High School, North Walpole, Charlestown, and Alstead (the former Vilas High School). This creation of a consolidated high school was part of the nationwide trend of school consolidation in the United States at this time. For example, the last graduating class of Vilas High School in 1966, one of the schools which merged into Fall Mountain Regional, was only 20 students.

JROTC

The JROTC at the school which was founded in 1996 has competed at a national level, participating in the national championship competition in 2021. Dutch photographer Ellen Kok spent two years documenting the school's group activities after seeing them at a parade in 2010.Teicher, Jordan G. (9 October 2015). Everyday life as a JROTC cadet, The Washington PostRooney, Jack. (8 June 2021). Fall Mountain JROTC team to compete in national championship,  The Keene SentinelMosley, John.  JROTC in the North Country, Upstate NH, Retrieved 28 September 2022 She published a book called "Cadets" from her work.Olson, Nancy A. (9 October 2015). Brattleboro's Lilac Ridge Farm featured in new book, Brattleboro Reformer

2020 Referendum

In 2020, Charlestown, which makes up 41 percent of the high school student body, considered withdrawing from the school. The fact that Charlestown pays a higher school tax rate fueled the issue. While a study committee had recommended withdrawal, the proposal would have increased costs in Charleston and the other towns. A voter referendum on the proposal was strongly rejected, including in Charlestown itself.(11 March 2020). Fall Mountain soundly rejects Charlestown withdrawal, The Keene Sentinel

References

External links

Schools in Sullivan County, New Hampshire
Public high schools in New Hampshire
Langdon, New Hampshire